The 2012 ITF Women's Circuit was the 2012 edition of the second-tier tour for women's professional tennis. The ITF Women's Circuit is organised by the International Tennis Federation and is a tier below the WTA Tour. The 2012 season consisted of 484 events in 63 countries with prize money ranging from $10,000 up to $100,000.

Schedule

January–March

April–June

July–September

October–December

Statistical information
To avoid confusion and double counting, these tables should be updated only after the end of the week.

Key

Titles won by player
As of December 31.

 Diana Buzean (previously known as Diana Enache)

Titles won by nation

As of December 31.

 Johanna Konta started representing Great Britain in June, she won one title while representing Australia.
 Yulia Putintseva started representing Kazakhstan in June, she won two titles while representing Russia.
 Julia Moriarty started representing Australia in August, she won one title while representing Ireland.

Retirements

Ranking Distribution

See also
2012 WTA Tour
2012 WTA Challenger Tour
2012 ATP World Tour
2012 ATP Challenger Tour
2012 ITF Men's Circuit
Women's Tennis Association
International Tennis Federation

References

External links
 International Tennis Federation (ITF)

 
ITF Women's Circuit
ITF Women's World Tennis Tour
2012 in women's tennis